Earl Lloyd-George of Dwyfor is a title in the peerage of the United Kingdom. It was created in 1945 for Liberal parliamentarian David Lloyd George who served as Chancellor of the Exchequer from 1908 to 1915 and Prime Minister of the United Kingdom from 1916 to 1922. He was created Viscount Gwynedd, of Dwyfor in the County of Caernarvon, also in the peerage of the United Kingdom, at the same time.

Lloyd George's family name is not hyphenated, although it was required to appear as such in his title,  as in other cases such as Andrew Lloyd Webber, Baron Lloyd-Webber.

Both the territorial designations Dwyfor and Gwynedd are ancient Welsh placenames. They were subsequently revived, in 1974, for a local government district and county respectively.

The family titles are currently held by his great-grandson, the 4th Earl, who succeeded his father in 2010.

Two of David Lloyd George's children also earned distinction in public life. His second son the Hon. Gwilym Lloyd George was Home Secretary from 1954 to 1957 before being created Viscount Tenby in 1957; and, his daughter Lady Megan Lloyd George CH MP represented Anglesey and Carmarthen in the House of Commons.

The family seat during the 3rd Earl's lifetime was Ffynone, near Boncath, Pembrokeshire.

Earls Lloyd-George of Dwyfor (1945)
David Lloyd George OM PC, 1st Earl Lloyd-George of Dwyfor (1863–1945) — Prime Minister of the United Kingdom (1916–1922)
Richard Lloyd George, 2nd Earl Lloyd-George of Dwyfor (1889–1968)
Owen Lloyd George, 3rd Earl Lloyd-George of Dwyfor (1924–2010)
David Richard Owen Lloyd George, 4th Earl Lloyd-George of Dwyfor (b. 1951).

Present peer
David Richard Owen Lloyd George, 4th Earl Lloyd-George of Dwyfor (born 22 January 1951), the son of the third earl and his wife Ruth Margaret Coit, was educated at Eton College. He was styled as Viscount Gwynedd between 1968 and 2010, when he succeeded to the peerages.

In 1985, he married Pamela Alexandra Kleyff, a daughter of Alexander Kleyff, and they have two children:
William Alexander Lloyd George, Viscount Gwynedd (born 1986), a journalist. 
Frederick Owen Lloyd George (born 1987), Assistant Equerry to Camilla, Queen Consort and like his great-great-grandfather a Freeman of the Curriers' Company.

Line of succession

  David Lloyd George, 1st Earl Lloyd-George of Dwyfor (1863–1945)
  Richard Lloyd George, 2nd Earl Lloyd-George of Dwyfor (1889–1968)
  Owen Lloyd George, 3rd Earl Lloyd-George of Dwyfor (1924–2010)
  David Richard Owen Lloyd George, 4th Earl Lloyd-George of Dwyfor (born 1951) 
 (1) William Alexander Lloyd George, Viscount Gwynedd (born 1986)
 (2) Hon. Frederick Owen Lloyd George (born 1987)
 (3) Thomas Lloyd George (born 2018)
 (4) Hon. Robert John Daniel Lloyd George (born 1952)
 (5) Richard Joseph Lloyd George (born 1983)
 (6) Alexander Gwilym Lloyd George (born 1994)
 (7) Nicholas John Lloyd George (born 1998)
 (8) Robert Owen Lloyd George (born 1999)
 (9) David Charles Lloyd George (born 2002)
  Gwilym Lloyd George, 1st Viscount Tenby (1894–1967) 
  David Lloyd George, 2nd Viscount Tenby (1922–1983)
 (10)  Rt. Hon. William Lloyd George, 3rd Viscount Tenby (born 1927). Elected to remain in the House in 1999; retired in 2015 and was replaced by Lord Mountevans.
 (11, 1) Hon. Timothy Henry Gwilym Lloyd George (born 1962)

See also
Viscount Tenby
Dowager Countess Lloyd-George of Dwyfor CBE

Notes

External links
  Kidd, Charles & Williamson, David (editors). Debrett's Peerage and Baronetage (1990 edition). New York: St Martin's Press.
 BBC Wales: David Lloyd George – World War One Prime Minister
 David Lloyd George Exhibition, National Library of Wales
 Hereditary Peerage Association

 
Earldoms in the Peerage of the United Kingdom

1945 establishments in the United Kingdom
Noble titles created in 1945
Lloyd-George of Dwyfor
Noble titles created for UK MPs